Robert Strelley (by 1518 – 23 January 1554), of Great Bowden, Leicestershire, was an English politician.

He was a Member (MP) of the Parliament of England for Leicestershire in October 1553.

He served as a Chamberlain of the Exchequer from 1553 until his death the following year.  He married Frideswide, the daughter of John Knight of Spaldington, Yorkshire but left no children.

References

1554 deaths
Members of the Parliament of England for Leicestershire
People from Great Bowden
English MPs 1553 (Mary I)
Year of birth uncertain